Yardbird may refer to: 
 Charlie Parker, American saxophonist
 George Yardley, American basketball player
 A colloquialism for the domestic chicken in the American Deep South
 A slang term for a jailbird
 A slang term for a basic trainee in the armed forces
 Railyard, sections of parallel train tracks, where many rail cars are
 Yardbird Reader, journal edited by Ishmael Reed from 1972 to 1976)